Advertising or marketing clutter refers to the large volume of advertising messages that the average consumer is exposed to on a daily basis.

Background 
One explanation, in a general sense, is that advertising clutter is often a result of a marketplace that is (over)-crowded with competing products. Heightened competition from this phenomenon has led to the emergence of other advertising strategies, including guerrilla marketing, viral marketing, and experiential marketing along with new focuses on humanising messaging within marketing.

Online advertising clutter 
Studies have shown that annoyance factors from online advertising clutter is a significant contributor to advertising avoidance.

References

Citations

Sources 

<li> "The Persuaders," Frontline, PBS, November 9, 2004; 
<li> 
<li> "The Real Competition Is Clutter : Marty Neumeier," ''Humanise The Brand Magazine

Further reading
 
 
 
 
 
 
 
 

Advertising